Camille Leblanc-Bazinet (born October 10, 1988) is a Canadian professional CrossFit Games athlete. She is the female winner of the 2014 CrossFit Games.

Early life
Leblanc-Bazinet was born in Richelieu, Quebec on October 10, 1988, to Danielle Leblanc and Roger Bazinet. Throughout her early years, she did gymnastics at a high level for almost 14 years. 
At age 16, her career as a gymnast was stopped after tearing her hip. After recovering, she played senior AA soccer and volleyball. She later was the captain of her flag football team in college. Leblanc-Bazinet also spent time running half marathons, skiing, and playing rugby. In an interview, she said she was introduced to CrossFit after a man told her she was not in shape at a team party. Prior to joining, Leblanc-Bazinet's parents were "totally against it" and her friends believed that it was too dangerous. However, they all decided to give it a try and have continued.

Personal life
In 2013, Leblanc-Bazinet married fellow CrossFitter, Dave Lipson.
She earned a degree in Chemical Engineering from the Université de Sherbrooke.
Her twin sister Rachel Leblanc-Bazinet is an Olympic weightlifter for Team Canada.

CrossFit Games results

References

CrossFit athletes
Living people
1988 births
Université de Sherbrooke alumni
People from Montérégie
Sportspeople from Quebec
People with acquired American citizenship